Lycodryas citrinus is a species of snake of the family Pseudoxyrhophiidae.

Geographic range
The snake is found in Madagascar.

Description
The snake is bright yellow with black spots on its back.

References 

Reptiles of Madagascar
Reptiles described in 1995
Pseudoxyrhophiidae